The 1971–72 All-Ireland Senior Club Football Championship was the second staging of the All-Ireland Senior Club Football Championship since its establishment by the Gaelic Athletic Association in 1970-71.

On 12 May 1972, Bellaghy won the championship following a 0-15 to 1-11 defeat of University College Cork in the All-Ireland final at Croke Park. It remains their only championship title.

Results

All-Ireland Senior Club Football Championship

Final

Championship statistics

Miscellaneous

 Portlaoise won the Leinster Club Championship for the first time in their history. They were also the first team from Laois to win the provincial title.
 Claremorris won the Connacht Club Championship title for the first time in their history.

References

1971 in Gaelic football
1972 in Gaelic football